Futility or Futile may refer to:

Futility, or the Wreck of the Titan, an 1898 novel
"Futility" (poem), 1918 poem by Wilfred Owen
Futile (EP), a 2003 EP album by Porcupine Tree
Futility (album), a 2004 album of the industrial death metal band DÅÅTH
Futility, a 1922 novel by William Gerhardie